The Përmeti I Government was the 2nd ruling government of Albania, formed on 14 March 1914, following the arrival of Prince Wied in the country.

Overview 
With Wied's arrival in Albania, Durrës was designated as the country's new capital. Here, Turhan Pasha Përmeti formed a government cabinet of eight ministers who for the most part were supporters of Italy. Political rivalry arose between the two allies of the newly formed Albanian State and this became more evident with Esad Toptani's departure from the government. The first and second governments of Turhan Pasha, which seemed to be a "race" between Italians and Austrians for supremacy, were ineffective and produced little to no results.

The Prime Minister grew tired of the long political and diplomatic  disputes and did not have it with the right nerve to head governments that required energy, patience and of course international support. In both his governments, Përmeti cooperated with the two pashas, Esad Toptani and Aqif Biçakçiu. The two political opponents were in fact cousins, related by blood, yet they never found the language for co-governance and joint political action.
But while Esad Toptani was politically sacrificed by the Austro-Hungarians, Aqif Biçakçiu followed the fall of the government which had become a casualty from the events of the First World War  and the success of the insurgent uprising in Central Albania.

The prime minister and the prince, were placed in a position to govern and lead a country that was in turmoil and political instability. Both may have been competent leaders in other dissimilar situations to that of Albania. For this reason, the Minister of Internal Affairs was perceived as the main figure of the government. Turhan Pasha, in his speeches, made claims that his government would attach importance to the economy, industry, trade and education. He criticized the Greek policy of portraying the Orthodox Albanian population as greek. From an organizational point of view, aside from the Ministry of Internal Affairs, the rest of the cabinet was dysfunctional.

Cabinet

Notes

See also
 Politics of Albania
 Turhan Pasha Përmeti

References

G2
Ministries established in 1914
1914 establishments in Albania
1914 disestablishments in Albania
Ministries disestablished in 1914